Viraat is a 2016 Indian Kannada-language action drama film directed by H. Vasu and written by M. S. Ramesh. The film, produced by C. Kalyan under Theja Cinemas banner, features Darshan as the lead protagonist whilst newcomers Vidhisha Srivatsav, Isha Chawla and Chaitra Chandranath play the female lead characters. P. Ravi Shankar, Suhasini Maniratnam and Sumalatha play crucial supporting roles. It was dubbed into Hindi under the same title Viraat.

V. Harikrishna has composed the film's music and background score. The dialogues and screenplay is written by M. S. Ramesh.

The film which was earlier slated for a 2012 release underwent significant delays during the making due to the earlier producer and director tussles which ended up in the producer Sandesh Nagaraj walking out of the film. The film was eventually shelved and later was taken up by C.Kalyan, a Tollywood-based producer. The film finally released on 29 January 2016.

Cast
 Darshan as Viraat Prasad
 Isha Chawla as Preethi
 Vidisha Shrivastav as Spoorthi
 Chaitra Chandranath as Keerthi
 Suhasini Maniratnam as Chief Minister
 Sumalatha as Viraat's mother
 P. Ravi Shankar as Surendra Singh
 Srinivasa Murthy
 Sadhu Kokila
 Bullet Prakash
 Chitra Shenoy
 Padma Vasanthi
 Bank Janardhan
 Thulasi Shivamani

Production
The official launch and the first schedule shooting of Viraat began on 27 February 2012. The film considered to be a big budget venture with a big glass house worth crores of rupees is being made at the Bababudangiri Hills for the first 15 days shooting schedule. Actress Suhasini Maniratnam played the role of a powerful Chief Minister for the first time in her career.

Reception

The Bangalore Mirror gave the movie 3 stars. Its review said, "[T]he film has its moments but the film isn't exactly a must-watch, except for the hero's fans", and added, "[T]he plot is more like the TV reality show The Bachelor".

Music 

Music for the film is composed by V. Harikrishna who is the regular composer for Darshan's films. A single song is composed and sung by Raghu Kunche, making his debut in Kannada cinema. The song "Gandasu Safety Pin" is a recreation of Kunche's Telugu song "Ramanamma" from the film Bumper Offer.

The audio launch was held on January 12, 2016. The audio rights has been bought by Lahari Music.

External links

References

2016 films
Films set in Bangalore
2010s Kannada-language films
Indian action films
Films scored by V. Harikrishna
Films shot in Bangalore
Films shot in Switzerland
Films scored by Raghu Kunche
2016 action films